Danny Tamberelli  is an American actor and musician. He is known for his portrayal of Little Pete in The Adventures of Pete & Pete from 1989 to 1995, as the voice and actor of Jimmy De Santa in the 2013 video game Grand Theft Auto V and for his work as a cast member of the Nickelodeon sketch comedy series All That.

Early life and education
Tamberelli was raised in Maywood, New Jersey and moved to Wyckoff, New Jersey, where he attended Ramapo High School, graduating in 2000. He is of Italian and Irish descent. Tamberelli is a graduate of Hampshire College, where he earned a bachelor's degree in interdisciplinary arts focusing on music performance and booking management.

Career
Tamberelli's first performance was in a Huggies commercial, according to a 1994 interview. His first regular television role, at age 4, was as Sean Novak on the ABC daytime soap opera Ryan's Hope. He originally appeared from 1986 to 1987, when his character, along with his on-screen parents, were written off the show. However, he returned to the role in the fall of 1988 when the Novak family was brought back, to help close up storylines in preparation for the Ryan's Hope finale in January 1989.

Afterwards, Tamberelli played Jackie Rodowsky on the television series The Baby-Sitters Club. It was around this time that he was cast as Little Pete Wrigley on The Adventures of Pete & Pete, which first began as a series of 60-second shorts on Nickelodeon in 1989. After progressing to a batch of specials, Pete & Pete became a regular half-hour sitcom in 1993, and brought Tamberelli more recognition. During his time in the show, he met the musicians Iggy Pop and Mark Mulcahy, who inspired him to become a musician too; Iggy would teach him how to play the song T.V. Eye (from The Stooges' album Fun House) on bass in between breaks, when Tamberelli was 11. Around that time he provided the voice for Arnold in The Magic School Bus, as well as appearing in the films Igby Goes Down and The Mighty Ducks. He was also on Nickelodeon's All That from 1997 to 2000 and Figure It Out from 1997 to 1999, and guest starred in the Space Cases episode "All You Can Eaty". In the 2013 video game Grand Theft Auto V, he provided the voice and physical inspiration for Jimmy Townley/Jimmy De Santa.

Tamberelli is the bassist and vocalist for the rock band Jounce, formed in Northern New Jersey. They started in the early 2000s as a jazz funk quartet, but their sound later evolved into "90s music-inspired post-punk". They released an eponymous debut album on July 18, 2006, followed by their sophomore effort, These Things on March 31, 2009. The EP titled Meet Me in the Middle was released digitally on April 4, 2011. As of 2016, the only remaining members from the original formation were Tamberelli and childhood friend and guitarist Matt DeSteno. Tamberelli was also the bassist for the folk/pop band Every Good Boy.

In 2013, he started a podcast with former The Adventures of Pete and Pete co-star Michael C. Maronna. He is also a founding member of the sketch comedy group Manboobs, along with Jeremy Balon. He also made a guest appearance on the podcasts "The Comedy Button" and "The Indoor Kids".

Personal life
Tamberelli married author Katelyn Detweiler in early 2018. In 2019, they had a son, and in 2022, they had a daughter.

Filmography

Film

Television

Video games

References

External links

The Adventures of Danny and Mike
Jounce (official site)
ManBoobs Comedy (official site)
Lego commercial
Geekbox.net – Home of the Comedy Button

20th-century American male actors
21st-century American male actors
20th-century American musicians
21st-century American musicians
American male child actors
American male television actors
American male voice actors
American people of Irish descent
American people of Italian descent
American podcasters
Hampshire College alumni
Living people
Male actors from New Jersey
Musicians from New Jersey
People from Maywood, New Jersey
People from Wyckoff, New Jersey
Ramapo High School (New Jersey) alumni
American expatriate male actors in the United Kingdom
Year of birth missing (living people)